The Karingattukavu Devi Temple is located at Prayar Village, Chengannur Taluk, Kerala, India on the bank of the river Pampa. It is a Durga and Bhadrakali temple. An annual festival is held at the temple during the Meena month (March) of the Malayalam Calendar, and the most important day is Karthika.

Hindu temples in Alappuzha district
Devi temples in Kerala